Padang Midin is a small village in Kuala Terengganu District, Terengganu, Malaysia.

Kuala Terengganu District
Villages in Terengganu